Wildcat is an unincorporated community in Lewis County, West Virginia, United States.

The community was named after the wildcat native to the area.

References

Unincorporated communities in Lewis County, West Virginia
Unincorporated communities in West Virginia